Brenda W. Clough (also credited as B.W. Clough) (pronounced Cluff) is an American science fiction and fantasy writer. She has been nominated for the Hugo and Nebula Awards in 2002 for her novella May Be Some Time. As of 2014, she taught writing workshops at the Writers Center in Bethesda, Maryland.

Background and personal life 
Born Brenda Wang on November 13, 1955, in Washington, D.C., she is the child of parents born in China, and states, "for the first five years of my life I spoke only Chinese. I am told that I started kindergarten without a word of English. I can remember nothing of this, and now only speak Chinese at, you guessed it, a five-year-old level." She is a self-described "State Department brat... My father worked for the State Department, and so we lived in Asia and Europe for years. Until we get an off-planet colony going, living in a foreign country is as good as we're going to get, meeting aliens. There are still places on this planet where you can go and it's as foreign as Mars"; according to her website, "as a girl" she attended the American School of Vientiane in Laos, and her recollections include incidents in Hong Kong and Manila. She later attended Carnegie Mellon University.

She lives with her husband, Larry Clough, in Portland, Oregon.

Bibliography

Novels

Averidan series
 The Crystal Crown, DAW, New York, 1984. 
 The Dragon of Mishbil, DAW, New York, 1985. 
 The Realm Beneath, DAW, New York, 1986. 
 The Name of the Sun, DAW, New York, 1988.

Suburban Gods series
 How Like a God, Tor Books, New York, 1997. 
 Doors of Death and Life, Tor Books, New York, 2000. 
 Out of the Abyss (as yet unpublished sequel to Doors of Death and Life)

Other novels
 An Impossumble Summer, Walker and Company, New York, 1992. 
 Revise the World, Book View Cafe, 2009. 
 Speak to Our Desires, Book View Cafe, 2011. 
 The River Twice, Book View Cafe, 2019. 
 Meet Myself There, Book View Cafe, 2019. 
 The Fog of Time, Book View Cafe, 2019.

Short stories 
"Ain't Nothin' but a Hound Dog", Rod Serling's The Twilight Zone Magazine, 1988 [link]
"The Indecorous Rescue of Clarinda Merwin", Aboriginal SF, Mar/Apr 1989
"Provisional Solution", Carmen Miranda's Ghost is Haunting Space Station Three, 1990
"La Vita Nuova", Carmen Miranda's Ghost Is Haunting Space Station Three, 1990
"In the Good Old Summer Time", Newer York, 1991
"Mastermind of Oz" (with Lawrence Watt-Evans), Amazing, April 1993
"The Bottomless Pit", Marion Zimmer Bradley's Fantasy Magazine, Winter 1994
"Handing on the Goggles", Superheroes, 1995
"The Product of the Extremes", How to Save the World 1995
"To Serve a Prince", Science Fiction Age, Nov. 1995
"The Birth Day", The Sandman: Book of Dreams, HarperPrism, 1996
"Grow Your Own", Alfred Hitchcock's Mystery Magazine, 2000
"Times Fifty", Christianity Today, October 1, 2001 
"May Be Some Time", Analog, April 2001
"Tiptoe, On a Fence Post", Analog, July–August 2002
"Escape Hatch", Paradox, Autumn 2003
"How the Bells Came from Yang to Hubei", The First Heroes, Tor 2004

Non-fiction 
"Prairie Oysters in Hell: Interpretations of Isherwood in Dramatic Media", The Reston Review, first quarter 1992 [link]
"The Theory and Practice of Titles", SFWA Bulletin, Fall 1995 [link]
"Why I live in Washington, DC", SFWA Bulletin, Fall 1997
"Swindlers, Sharks & Scams: Writer Beware!" (with Ann C. Crispin), SFWA Bulletin, series starting in Vol 32, Issue 3, Winter 1998
Jo Clayton's Online Lifeline, 1999 [link]
"Inside Worldcon: the Writers Tour", SFWA Bulletin, Spring 2003
"Pride and Preservation, or Finding a Home for Your Papers" (with Colleen R. Cahill), SFWA Bulletin, Winter 2004

References

External links

Review, "May Be Some Time"

Living people
20th-century American novelists
21st-century American novelists
American fantasy writers
American science fiction writers
American women short story writers
American women novelists
American writers of Chinese descent
Women science fiction and fantasy writers
20th-century American women writers
21st-century American women writers
20th-century American short story writers
21st-century American short story writers
Carnegie Mellon University alumni
1955 births